Siphonocryptida is an order of millipedes, comprising the sole family Siphonocryptidae. With only seven described species, the Siphonocryptida is the second smallest millipede order, surpassed only by Siphoniulida, with two species.

Classification
Hirudicryptus Enghoff & Golovatch, 1995
Hirudicryptus canariensis (Loksa, 1967) - Canary Islands
Hirudicryptus taiwanensis Korsós et al., 2008 - Taiwan
Hirudicryptus quintumelementum Korsós et al., 2009 - Tibet
Hirudicryptus abchasicus Golovatch, Evsyukov & Reip, 2015 - NW Caucasus
Siphonocryptus Pocock, 1894
Siphonocryptus compactus Pocock, 1894 - Sumatra
Siphonocryptus latior Enghoff & Golovatch, 1995 - Peninsular Malaysia
Siphonocryptus zigzag Enghoff, 2010 - Pahang

References

Millipede orders
Millipedes of Asia
Monotypic arthropod taxa